Feeding Time may refer to:

Feeding Time (video game), 2014
"Feeding Time", a short story in Notions: Unlimited
"Feeding Time", an episode of Tom and Jerry Tales
"Feeding Time" (Superman: The Animated Series), a 1996 episode of Superman: The Animated Series